Fredrik Pettersson-Wentzel (born July 23, 1991) is a Swedish professional ice hockey goaltender who is currently playing for the ZSC Lions in the National League (NL).

Playing career
Pettersson-Wentzel was drafted 128th overall by the Atlanta Thrashers in the 2010 NHL Entry Draft. He led Allsvenskan goaltenders in GAA for the 2009–10 season, but after failing to produce similar numbers in the following season Pettersson-Wentzel chose to sign with Timrå in Elitserien for the second half of the 2010–11 season. Pettersson-Wentzel's Elitserien debut came on January 22, 2011 in relief of Juha Pitkämäki.

After his third season with HV71 in 2017–18, Pettersson-Wentzel left Sweden as a free agent and agreed to a one-year contract with German outfit, Düsseldorfer EG of the DEL, on March 21, 2018. Following his lone season in 2018–19 with Düsseldorfer EG. Wentzel was not offered a new contract with Düsseldorfer on April 6, 2019.

On 31 May 2019, Pettersson-Wentzel returned to his native Sweden, agreeing to a one-year contract with newly promoted SHL club, IK Oskarshamn.

International play
Pettersson-Wentzel represented Sweden at the 2011 World Junior Ice Hockey Championships along with Robin Lehner.

Career statistics

Regular season

Playoffs

International statistics

Awards and honors

References

External links

1991 births
Living people
Almtuna IS players
Atlanta Thrashers draft picks
Düsseldorfer EG players
Färjestad BK players
HV71 players
Nyköpings Hockey players
IK Oskarshamn players
Sportspeople from Uppsala
Swedish ice hockey goaltenders
Timrå IK players